Crassispira cortezi is a species of sea snail, a marine gastropod mollusk in the family Pseudomelatomidae.

Description
The length of the shell attains 32.4 mm.

Distribution
This species occurs in the Pacific Ocean from Mexico to Peru.

References

 Shasky, Donald R., and G. B. Campbell. "New and otherwise interesting species of mollusks from Guaymas, Sonora, Mexico." Veliger 7.2 (1964): 114–120.

External links
  Tucker, J.K. 2004 Catalog of recent and fossil turrids (Mollusca: Gastropoda). Zootaxa 682:1–1295
 
 James H. McLean & Roy Poorman, A Revised Classification of the Family Turridae, with the Proposal of New Subfamilies, Genera, and Subgenera from the Eastern Pacific; The Veliger  vol. 14, 1971

cortezi
Gastropods described in 1964